Francis Ullathorne Gledhill (1803 – 2 October 1882) was a New Zealand politician.

He was born in 1803 in Halifax, Yorkshire, England, and came to New Zealand in 1844, settling in New Plymouth and opening a shop and the first tanning works in the area. He served in the first and third Parliaments, representing New Plymouth in the former and Omata in the latter. Between his two terms in office, he was a volunteer in the First Taranaki War.

He died in New Plymouth on 2 October 1882, and was buried at Te Henui Cemetery.

Further reading
Some of Gledhill's papers may be found within  in New Plymouth. Much of this material is military in subject matter, referring to his service in the First Taranaki War. See

References

1803 births
1882 deaths
Members of the New Zealand House of Representatives
People from Taranaki
People of the New Zealand Wars
New Zealand MPs for North Island electorates
People from Halifax, West Yorkshire
English emigrants to New Zealand
Burials at Te Henui Cemetery
19th-century New Zealand politicians